Adejeania brevirostris is a species of parasitic fly in the family Tachinidae. It is found in Mexico.

References

Further reading

 
 

Adejeania
Articles created by Qbugbot
Insects described in 1947